The Racine Correctional Institution is a state prison for men located in Sturtevant, Racine County, Wisconsin, owned and operated by the Wisconsin Department of Corrections.  The facility opened in 1991 and holds 1573 inmates at medium security.

Notable current and former inmates 

 Gerald M. Turner (nicknamed "The Halloween Killer") - convicted of raping and murdering 9-year-old trick-or-treater, Lisa Ann French in 1973, released from Racine Correctional Institution in 2018.

References

Prisons in Wisconsin
Buildings and structures in Racine County, Wisconsin
1991 establishments in Wisconsin